The 13th Congress of Deputies was a meeting of the Congress of Deputies, the lower house of the Spanish Cortes Generales, with the membership determined by the results of the general election held on 28 April 2019. The congress met for the first time on 21 May 2019 and was dissolved prematurely on 24 September 2019.

Election
The 13th Spanish general election under the 1978 Constitution was held on 28 April 2019. It saw the Spanish Socialist Workers' Party (PSOE) became the largest party in the Congress of Deputies for the first time since 2008, but falling short of a majority.

History
The new congress met for the first time on 21 May 2019 and after two rounds of voting Meritxell Batet (PSOE) was elected as President of the Congress of Deputies with the support of the Unidos Podemos–En Comú Podem (UP–ECP) and various nationalist and regionalist parties.

Other members of the Bureau of the Congress of Deputies were also elected on 21 May 2019: Gloria Elizo (UP), First Vice-President; Alfonso Rodríguez (PSOE), Second Vice-President; Ana Pastor (PP), Third Vice-President; Ignacio Prendes (Cs), Fourth Vice-President; Gerardo Pisarello (ECP), First Secretary; Sofía Hernanz (PSOE), Second Secretary; Adolfo Suárez (PP), Third Secretary; and Patricia Reyes (Cs), Fourth Secretary.

Government

In July 2019, caretaker Prime Minister Pedro Sánchez (PSOE) failed to secure the necessary votes in congress to form a government after the failure of coalition talks with UP–ECP.

Unable to obtain enough support in congress to form a government, Sánchez announced on 17 September 2019 that an election would be held on 10 November 2019, the fourth in as many years. The 13th Cortes Generales was formally dissolved on 24 September 2019.

Deaths, disqualifications, resignations and suspensions
The 13th congress has seen the following deaths, disqualifications, resignations and suspensions:
 24 May 2019  – Jailed Catalan deputies Oriol Junqueras (ERC–Sob), Josep Rull (JxCat), Jordi Sànchez (JxCat) and Jordi Turull (JxCat), currently being tried on charges of rebellion, sedition, criminal organization and misuse of public funds in relation to the Catalan independence referendum and subsequent declaration of independence, are suspended from congress.
 31 May 2019 – Rafael Catalá (PP) resigned to return to the private sector. He was replaced by María Jesús Bonilla (PP) on 12 June 2019.
 26 June 2019 – Toni Roldán (Cs) resigned following political disagreement with the Citizens leadership. He was replaced by Carina Mejías (Cs) on 15 July 2019.
 8 July 2019 – Blanca Fernández (PSOE) resigned after being appointed Minister of Equality of Castilla–La Mancha. She was replaced by Cristina López (PSOE) on 15 July 2019.
 17 July 2019 – María Isabel Blanco (PP) resigned after being appointed Minister of Family and Equal Opportunities of Castile and León. She was replaced by Elvira Velasco (PP) on 19 July 2019.
 19 August 2019 – Marta Rivera (Cs) resigned after being appointed Minister of Culture and Tourism of the Community of Madrid. She was replaced by María Vilas (Cs) on 29 August 2019.
 5 September 2019 – Francisco de la Torre (Cs) resigned following political disagreement with the Citizens leadership.

Members

See also
 13th Cortes Generales
 13th Senate of Spain

Notes

References
 
 

2019 establishments in Spain
2019 disestablishments in Spain
Congress of Deputies (Spain)